The FIL World Luge Natural Track Championships 1984 took place in Kreuth, West Germany.

Men's singles

Women's singles

Men's doubles

Medal table

References
Men's doubles natural track World Champions
Men's singles natural track World Champions
Women's singles natural track World Champions

FIL World Luge Natural Track Championships
1984 in luge
1996 in German sport
Luge in Germany